Sailfish is the common name for fish of the genus Istiophorus.

Sailfish may also refer to:

Technology
 Sailfish OS, a mobile operating system
 Sailfish Alliance, an open alliance for Sailfish OS
 Pixel (1st generation) (codename Sailfish), a smartphone by Google

Ships and boats
 Sailfish (sailboat), a board-boat style of sailing dinghy
 Sailfish-class submarine, a US class of submarine built for radar picket 
 USS Sailfish (SS-192), a US submarine in commission in 1939 and again from 1940 to 1945
 USS Sailfish (SSR-572), a US submarine in commission from 1956 to 1978